Scopula cineraria  is a moth of the family Geometridae. It is endemic to Japan.

References

Moths described in 1897
cineraria
Moths of Japan
Taxa named by John Henry Leech